Streptomyces olivicoloratus is a bacterium species from the genus of Streptomyces which has been isolated from forest soil in Jeollabuk-do in Korea. Streptomyces olivicoloratus produces antibiotics.

See also 
 List of Streptomyces species

References

External links
Type strain of Streptomyces olivicoloratus at BacDive -  the Bacterial Diversity Metadatabase	

olivicoloratus
Bacteria described in 2015